The George L. Sanford House, at 405 N. Roop St. in Carson City, Nevada, United States, was built in c.1910.  It includes Bungalow/craftsman, Stick/Eastlake, and Second Empire architecture.  It was listed on the National Register of Historic Places in 1994;  the listing included two contributing buildings.

George L. Sanford came to Nevada in about 1906, and was experienced in law and in the
newspaper industry;  he came to control the Carson City News newspaper.  It was deemed significant as the sole surviving buildings associated with the "powerful" Sanford family (including George's brothers Graham and Leigh) and also for its architecture.

References 

Houses completed in 1910
Houses on the National Register of Historic Places in Nevada
National Register of Historic Places in Carson City, Nevada
Queen Anne architecture in Nevada
Second Empire architecture in Nevada
Houses in Carson City, Nevada